Předmostí (Skalka) (often without diacritics as Predmosti or Predmost), situated in the north western part of Přerov, Moravia near the city of Přerov, is an important Late Pleistocene hill site of Central Europe.

A fossil site at Předmostí is located near Přerov in the country Moravia of what is today the Czech Republic. The site was discovered in the late 19th century. Excavations were conducted between 1884 and 1930. As the original material was lost. The skeletal remains of the few dozen people from Předmostí are among the most important finds ever made of anatomically modern humans, and are accompanied by items from the Gravettian culture. A major restriction on the opportunities available for extracting information from this Upper Paleolitic population assembly, however, came with the irreparable damage done to the skeletal material during fire at Mikulov Castle near the end of the World War II, which almost completely destroyed the entire collection. For many years, the only sources of scientific information relating to the assemblage available were the two-volume work by Jindřich Matiegka (1934 and 1938) and casts made of the skulls of individuals Předmostí 3 and Předmostí 4, and the endocrania of individuals Předmostí 3, 4, 9 and 101, in the collection of Moravian Museum in Brno.

A fragment of Predmostí 21's mandible was rediscovered in the Museum of Olomouc.

New excavations were conducted.

The Předmostí site appears to have been a living area with associated burial ground with some 20 burials, including 15 complete human interments, and portions of five others, representing either disturbed or secondary burials. Cannibalism has been suggested to explain the apparent subsequent disturbance, though it is not widely accepted. The non-human fossils are mostly mammoth. Many of the bones are heavily charred, indicating they were cooked. Other remains include fox, reindeer, ice-age horse, wolf, bear, wolverine, and hare. Remains of three dogs were also found, one of which had a mammoth bone in its mouth.

The Předmostí site is dated to between 24,000 and 37,000 years old. The people had robust features indicative of a big-game hunter lifestyle. They also share square eye socket openings found in the French material. Skulls of Předmostí individuals are significantly longer and more robust than of modern Europeans, with thick brow ridges, and prognathism, and show marked sexual dimorphism. They also display a degree of variability.

History of research 

It was here that Jindřich Wankel, and shortly afterwards K.J. Maška himself, conducted their excavations. Two years after the words above were written, the endeavours of K.J. Maška – an amateur archeologist with a professional approach-were crowned by the discovery of human bones on an unprecedented scale, together with the first find of a human lower jaw made by Wankel in 1884 and the later finds of M. Kříž (1886) and K. Absolon (1929), there were the fossil human remains discovered at Předmostí.

References
Dolni Vestonice I – the Kiln and Encampment. Don's Maps- Paleolithic European, Russian and Australian Archaeology. Ed. Don Hitchcock.
Jelínek, J., Pictorial Encyclopedia of the Evolution of Man, Prague: Hamlyn (1975).
National Geographic Magazine, The National Geographic Society, October 1988.
Price, T. D., and G. M. Feinman. Images of the past. New York: McGraw-Hill Higher Education, 2010. Print.
Pringle, Heather. "Ice Age Communities May Be Earliest Known Net Hunters." Science Magazine 277.5300 (1997): 1203–204. Science. Web. Trinkaus, Erik, *Shreeve, James, The Neandertal Enigma: Solving the Mystery of Modern Human Origins, New York: William Morrow and Company (1995).
Tedlock, Barbara, "The Woman in the Shaman's Body; Reclaiming the feminine in religion and medicine", New York: Bantam Dell, 2005.

Further reading 
VELEMINSKÁ, Jana, BRŮŽEK, Jaroslav (eds.) (2008), Early modern humans from Předmostí. Praha, Academia. 
ABSOLON, Karel,(1929), New finds of fossils human skeleton in Moravia. Archeologie 7, 1–2 p. 79–89
JELÍNEK, Jan, ORVÁNOVÁ, E.(1999), Předmostí hominid remains. An up-dates. Czech and Slovak republics. In: Orban, R, Semal, F (eds.) Antropologie et Prehistorie, Suppl. 9, p. 70–77

Aurignacian
Paleoanthropology
Hominini
Archaeological sites in the Czech Republic
Upper Paleolithic sites in Europe
Prehistory of the Czech lands
South Moravian Region
Former populated places in the Czech Republic
European archaeology
Prehistoric cannibalism